John Francis Helwig (December 5, 1927 – December 2, 1994) was an American football linebacker who played four seasons with the Chicago Bears of the National Football League (NFL). He was drafted by the Bears in the eleventh round of the 1950 NFL Draft. He played college football at the University of Notre Dame and attended Mount Carmel High School in Los Angeles, California.

Professional career
Helwig was selected by the Chicago Bears with the 140th pick in the 1950 NFL Draft. He played in 42 games, starting 23 games, for the Bears from 1953 to 1956.

Personal life
Helwig's wife had been illegally collecting John's NFL pension since his death and had twice told officials that he was alive. After his wife's death in 2007, their daughter began collecting the pension before she was charged with fraud in 2011. The pension collected by John's wife and daughter after his death added up to over $200,000.

References

External links
Just Sports Stats

1927 births
1994 deaths
Players of American football from Los Angeles
American football linebackers
Notre Dame Fighting Irish football players
Chicago Bears players